The Decareaux House, also known as the Creole House Museum, is a historic house located at 16061 LA 16 in French Settlement, Louisiana.

Built in c.1898, the house is a one-story frame cottage in French Creole style. It was constructed by Harris and Alexander Lambert as a home for Mr. and Mrs. Alex Decareaux. In 1977 the house was donated to the village of French Settlement, Louisiana, which gave a long-term lease on the building to the French Settlement Historical Society. The house is now hosting the Creole House Museum.

The house was listed on the National Register of Historic Places on May 14, 1992.

See also
 National Register of Historic Places listings in Livingston Parish, Louisiana

References

Houses on the National Register of Historic Places in Louisiana
Creole architecture in Louisiana
Houses completed in 1898
Livingston Parish, Louisiana
National Register of Historic Places in Livingston Parish, Louisiana